West Coaster may refer to:

a person from the West Coast of the United States
Wild West Express Coaster, a roller coaster in Colorado, United States
The West Coaster (Tasmanian train)
The West Coaster, the name of a former train that ran in Victoria, Australia